Thysanopsis is a genus of parasitic flies in the family Tachinidae. There are at least two described species in Thysanopsis.

Species
These two species belong to the genus Thysanopsis:
 Thysanopsis albicauda Townsend, 1917
 Thysanopsis guimai Toma, 2001

References

Further reading

 
 
 
 

Tachinidae
Monotypic Brachycera genera
Articles created by Qbugbot